The Archer Connection is an upcoming comedy drama television series created by Chad Sanders that is set to premiere on BET.

Premise
The Archer Connection follows "tech genius Archer Grant, a young, black, iconoclastic mastermind who has developed Archer App – a software that measures the sexual chemistry between its user and anyone in the room. In launching the app and managing its rapid growth, Archer clumsily navigates between worlds – hipster Brooklyn, bloodthirsty Wall Street, underground hip-hop, innovative Silicon Valley – while trying to avoid the treacherous grip of capitalism and his own precarious sex addiction."

Production
On April 17, 2018, it was announced that BET had given the production a series order for a first season consisting of ten episodes. The series was expected to be co-executive produced and written by Chad Sanders.

References

External links
 

English-language television shows
Upcoming comedy television series
Upcoming drama television series
BET original programming